"Kristy, Are You Doing Okay?" is a song by American punk rock band The Offspring. The song features as the seventh track (fifth track on the LP) on the band's eighth studio album, Rise and Fall, Rage and Grace (2008), and was released as its third single. The song impacted radio on November 25, 2008.

Content
The song was written about a girl that singer Dexter Holland knew as a child. She was sexually abused, and everybody in the neighborhood, including Dexter himself, knew about it but nobody took action. Holland wrote the song as an apology to the girl.

Music video
A music video was made with director Lex Halaby. It premiered on February 2, 2009 on AOLmusic.com.

The video depicts a teenage girl (Natalie Dreyfuss) who writes continuously in her diary about being abused. A boy in the class (a younger Dexter, played by Trevor Morgan) notices her, and suspects that something is wrong. However, he does nothing, and she is left alone. At the end of the video, after exchanging glances, Kristy leaves her diary on the school grandstand for Dexter.  The pages of the diary appear in the interspersed scenes of Dexter playing an acoustic guitar.

Charts

References

External links

The Offspring songs
2008 singles
Songs written by Dexter Holland
Rock ballads
Song recordings produced by Bob Rock
Songs about child abuse
2008 songs